Yingzong is the temple name of several emperors of China. It may refer to:

Emperor Yingzong of Song (1032–1067, reigned 1063–1067), emperor of the Song dynasty
Gegeen Khan (1302–1323, reigned 1320–1323), Emperor Yingzong of the Yuan dynasty
Emperor Yingzong of Ming (1427–1464, reigned 1435–1449 and 1457–1464), emperor of the Ming dynasty

See also
Anh Tông (disambiguation), Vietnamese equivalent

Temple name disambiguation pages